"Coon vs. Coon and Friends" is the thirteenth episode of the fourteenth season and the 208th overall episode of Comedy Central's series South Park. It originally aired on November 10, 2010; and was written and directed by series co-creator Trey Parker.

In its original American broadcast on November 10, 2010, "Coon vs. Coon and Friends" was watched by 3.249 million viewers, according to the Nielsen Media Research. It was the highest viewed scripted show. It received a 1.9 rating/5% share among adult viewers between ages 18 and 49.

In this episode, Cartman shows himself to be even more evil than the dark lord, Cthulhu, as he punishes his former partners in Coon & Friends. Kenny is wrestling with the weight of his own super power through his alter-ego, Mysterion.

The episode continues from previous South Park episodes "Coon 2: Hindsight" and "Mysterion Rises" and reveals the identities of all of Coon and Friends.

The episode was rated TV-MA-LV in the United States.

Plot
Bradley Biggle, as Mint Berry Crunch is summarizing the previous episode in a comic book format.  The boys raise concern over Mint Berry Crunch's super powers, as they do not accept "the power of mint and berry with a satisfying tasty crunch" as a legitimate super power. While discussing powers, the boys ask Mysterion about his power. Mysterion boldly states that "I can't die." The other boys, who are only imagining their powers, casually take note. Mysterion sees that they are not taking him seriously, and with mounting frustration, he elaborates to them that "I really, really can't die." He tries to remind them that they witnessed him being stabbed to death the night before, but the other boys do not remember at all. In an attempt to prove his point, Mysterion shouts at them to remember, pulls out a handgun, and shoots himself in the head, leaving the boys in utter shock. However, much to the annoyance of Mysterion, they later completely forget about it when everyone including himself returns for another meeting on good deeds.

After providing his own distorted summary of the story so far, Cartman (after using the "LeBron James Technique" to confuse his mother into not grounding him) arrives and lures the heroes outside, where he orders Cthulhu to banish them to a dark oblivion. Mint Berry Crunch runs away and pretends to be heroic by watching Judge Judy, while the rest of the heroes are transported to R'lyeh. With that done, Cartman has Cthulhu head to the Burning Man festival to massacre hippies. At R'lyeh, seeing death as his only potential escape back to Earth and save his friends, Mysterion commits suicide by jumping into a pit of deadly spikes (complaining about the pain of this particular manner of death as he does so). Kenny awakens back in his bed and dons his Mysterion outfit, setting off to learn more about Cthulhu and his own powers in order to save his friends. He goes to Henrietta's house, where she and the other Goth kids are complaining about Cthulhu not changing everything as they were made to believe, and claiming "It's just like Obama". Just then, Henrietta's mother comes in and tells her that her brother, who turns out to be Bradley, wants to play with them. Upon entering the room, Bradley sees Mysterion and runs back to his room to change into his Mint Berry Crunch outfit. Meanwhile, the Goth kids tell Mysterion that Cthulhu can only be killed by another immortal, meaning that Kenny is seemingly the only one who has the power to stop Cthulhu's rampage.

Followed by Mint Berry Crunch, Mysterion tracks down the Coon and Cthulhu as the latter have just finished massacring Justin Bieber and a number of his fans. After berating the Coon for re-making the world in his own image (something no superhero is meant to do), Mysterion challenges Cthulhu by offering him an easy win if he brings his friends back, only for Cthulhu to simply walk away after being influenced by the Coon's "cute kitten" act. A bright light descends from the air and a man appears inside, who reveals himself to be Bradley's biological father from a far away planet who sent his son to Earth to stop evil from taking over the Earth. Bradley, whose Mint Berry Crunch powers were actually real, manages to subdue Cthulhu, drag him back to the dimension from which he came, save the other heroes from oblivion, shut the hole which BP drilled into the Gulf of Mexico, and briefly return home to give the middle finger to his sister. With Cartman jailed at the Coon & Friends' secret base, Mint Berry Crunch vanishes in a flash of light as the rest of the heroes express surprise that Bradley really did have superpowers. Mysterion, disappointed that he did not learn anything about his true past and identity, says he is going to bed and shoots himself in the head. That night, his mother suddenly gives birth to another new baby Kenny. Wrapping him in an orange hoodie, she remarks to his father that they never should have gone to those cult meetings.

Cultural references
Like "Coon 2: Hindsight" and "Mysterion Rises" the third part heavily references the works of H. P. Lovecraft, especially the Cthulhu Mythos.

This episode also references the Merrie Melodies cartoon short Feed the Kitty, with Cartman acting as Pussyfoot and Cthulhu as Marc Antony in his "cute kitten" routine.

In his quest to "make the world a better place", the Coon (Eric Cartman's alter ego), persuades Cthulhu to destroy the Whole Food Market supermarket chain, which specializes in organic and healthy food. They attack the Burning Man festival, which is, according to Cartman, "the biggest hippie festival in the world". A news reporter at the site of the slaughter mistakes The Coon for "Bruce Vilanch in a rat costume", an assumption first made in "The Coon". Another target, and in Cartman's eyes, the "most challenging and most evil opponent", is Canadian singer Justin Bieber. The LeBron James Nike commercial is also spoofed again. Cartman tries to lure the boys out of his basement with promises of a double rainbow, coinciding with the popularity of the "Double Rainbow" viral video. The name of the song that Cartman sings while walking to his house is "Faith" by George Michael. At the end when Mint Berry Crunch discovers that he has powers, The NeverEnding Story theme song singer, Limahl, appears before him.

Reception

Broadcast and ratings
In its original American broadcast on November 10, 2010, "Coon vs. Coon and Friends" was watched by 2.786 million viewers, according to Nielsen Media Research, making it the most watched cable television show of the night, surpassing shows such as Psych, Terriers, Meet the Browns and The Ultimate Fighter in ratings. The episode received a 1.8 rating/3 share, meaning it was seen by 1.8 percent of the population, and 3 percent of people watching television at the time of its broadcast. Among male viewers between ages 18 and 34, the episode received a 3.4 rating/11 share. Among adult viewers between ages 18 and 49, the episode received a 1.6 rating/5 share, falling two tenths in the ratings since the last episode.

Critical response
The episode received mostly positive reviews. IGN gave the episode a "great" score of 8.0 and said "The Coon and Friends trilogy comes to an end in grand fashion, with epic battles, strange alliances, and secret origins revealed. It's a tale told in the finest comic book traditions, and it's one of the most creative episodes South Park has produced recently." The A.V. Club gave the episode a B+, a vast improvement over the C and C+ rating given to Coon 2: Hindsight and Mysterion Rises, stating that the episode was "fleeter and funnier, it wasted less time on padded-out tangents, and it satisfactorily resolved the question of Kenny's immortality" and called the episode "as well-executed an ending as one could probably hope for here". Eric Hochberger of TV Fanatic gave the episode a score of 4 out of 5, calling it an "entertaining, fitting finish", stating that it "dropped all the things we hated about the first two parts" and delivered a "solid, fun half hour", praising the twist ending, the portrayal of Cartman and how he "believed he truly was making the world a better place", as well as the death of Justin Bieber.

Home media
"Coon vs. Coon and Friends", along with the thirteen other episodes from South Park's fourteenth season, were released on a three-disc DVD set and two-disc Blu-ray set in the United States on April 26, 2011.

References

External links

 "Coon vs. Coon and Friends" Full episode at South Park Studios
 

Cthulhu Mythos stories
Deepwater Horizon oil spill
Television episodes about immortality
Justin Bieber
South Park episodes in multiple parts
South Park (season 14) episodes
Suicide in television